Juliette Gordon Low Historic District consists of three buildings—the Juliette Gordon Low Birthplace (also known as Wayne-Gordon House, First Girl Scout Headquarters, which was the carriage house for the Andrew Low House, converted for use by the Girl Scouts in May–June 1912, and said Andrew Low Carriage House, is a site in Savannah, Georgia,  significant for its association with Juliette Gordon Low and the founding of the Girl Scouts of the USA.

The district includes the Wayne-Gordon House at 10 East Oglethorpe Avenue, which is also known as Juliette Gordon Low Birthplace, the First Girl Scout Headquarters (Andrew Low Carriage House) at 330 Drayton Street, and the Andrew Low House at 329 Abercorn Street.

The Birthplace was designated as a National Historic Landmark in 1965. The initial designation included the First Girl Scout Headquarters. The Andrew Low House was later added to the designation creating the Juliette Gordon Low Landmark District.

Juliette Gordon Low Birthplace

The Juliette Gordon Low Birthplace, also known as the Wayne-Gordon House, is owned by the Girl Scouts of the USA, and is a popular historic house museum for the general public and a Girl Scout national center commonly known as "The Birthplace". The house was built in 1818–1821 for James Moore Wayne, then the mayor of Savannah. Wayne was appointed to fill an unexpired term in the US House of Representatives, and then to the US Supreme Court, taking him to live in Washington, DC. In 1831, Wayne sold the house to his niece Sarah Stites Gordon, and her husband William Washington Gordon I, the first of four generations of Gordons to live in the house. They were Juliette Gordon Low's grandparents and her parents.

Juliette Low's parents, William Washington Gordon II and Eleanor Kinzie Gordon made major changes to the house in 1886, adding the fourth floor and the side piazza. Juliette Gordon Low was married in 1886, and spent much of the rest of her life living in England, though often visiting her parents at home and other family and friends in New York, New Jersey and Savannah every year.

As a restless and energetic widow in 1911, Juliette Gordon Low met Robert Baden Powell, founder of the Boy Scouts. He recruited her to become involved in the Girl Guides, and in 1912 she returned home to Savannah to start the movement in the US. While staying in her parents' home, she telephoned her cousin, Nina Anderson Pape, saying, "Come right over! I've got something for the girls of Savannah, and all America, and all the world, and we're going to start it tonight." She recruited girls all over town, on the steps of churches and the synagogue, from her cousin Nina's students, and the daughters of friends and acquaintances. Juliette Low held elaborate teas for the Girl Scouts in her mother's parlor as a way to recruit girls to the movement.

The Girl Scouts of the USA purchased the home in 1953, and have restored the house to serve as a portal to the Girl Scout Movement. In 1954, Savannah Landscape Architect Clermont Huger Lee planned the design and planting for a new formal period garden. Opened in 1956 as a historic house museum, the home features many original Gordon family furnishings, including art by Juliette Gordon Low herself. The Birthplace was designated as Savannah's first National Historic Landmark in 1965, on the first National Register of Historic Places.

The Birthplace is open for general tours Monday through Saturday. Store hours are Monday through Saturday. The site is closed Sundays and major holidays. Hours vary according to the season. Check the museum website for more information and to reserve a tour.

See also
 List of National Historic Landmarks in Georgia (U.S. state)
 National Register of Historic Places listings in Chatham County, Georgia

References

External links

Juliette Gordon Low Birthplace at Girl Scouts of the USA

National Historic Landmarks in Savannah, Georgia
Historic American Buildings Survey in Georgia (U.S. state)
Historic American Landscapes Survey in Georgia (U.S. state)
Historic districts on the National Register of Historic Places in Georgia (U.S. state)
Girl Scouts of the USA
Historic house museums in Georgia (U.S. state)
Museums in Savannah, Georgia
Scouting museums in the United States
Geography of Savannah, Georgia
National Register of Historic Places in Savannah, Georgia
Low, Julia Gordon
Savannah Historic District